Pascal Breier (born 2 February 1992) is a German professional footballer who plays as a forward for Hansa Rostock. He represented Germany at youth levels U15 through U17.

Career
Breier made his debut for VfB Stuttgart II in the 3. Liga on 16 October 2010. He signed on 28 June 2011 a professional contract until June 2015 with VfB Stuttgart. On 16 August 2012 he was loaned out to Sonnenhof Großaspach until December 2012.

For the 2015–16 season he returned to Sonnenhof Großaspach. In August 2016 he moved back to VfB Stuttgart II. Breier made his debut for the Bundesliga team of VfB Stuttgart on 19 December 2017 in the 2017–18 DFB-Pokal against Mainz 05.

On 1 January 2018, Breier moved to F.C. Hansa Rostock.

Career statistics

References

External links
 

1992 births
Living people
German footballers
Germany youth international footballers
VfB Stuttgart II players
SG Sonnenhof Großaspach players
VfB Stuttgart players
FC Hansa Rostock players
3. Liga players
Regionalliga players
Association football forwards
People from Nürtingen
Sportspeople from Stuttgart (region)
Footballers from Baden-Württemberg